The Hopman Cup X (also known as the Hyundai Hopman Cup for sponsorship reasons) was the tenth edition of the Hopman Cup tournament between nations in men's and women's tennis. The tournament commenced on 4 January 1998 at the Burswood Entertainment Complex in Burswood, Western Australia.

Entrants

Group stage teams

Play-off teams

Play-off round

Group stage

Group A

Standings

Australia vs. Sweden

Spain vs. Slovakia

Slovakia vs. Sweden

Australia vs. Spain

Spain vs. Sweden

Slovakia vs. Australia

Group B

Standings

South Africa vs. United States

France vs. Germany

South Africa vs. Germany

France vs. United States

United States vs. Germany

France vs. South Africa

Final

References

External links

Hopman Cups by year
Hopman Cup